Neochen debilis is an extinct species of goose from the Middle Pleistocene Belgrano Formation of Argentina. Argentine paleontologist Florentino Ameghino described the species from a tarsometatarsus discovered in La Plata. It was smaller than the extant Orinoco goose.

References

Bibliography

External links 
 
 

Tadorninae
Pleistocene birds
Quaternary birds of South America
Ensenadan
Pleistocene Argentina
Fossils of Argentina
Fossil taxa described in 1891
Taxa named by Florentino Ameghino